Edward Price Furber CBE (1864 – 9 August 1940) was a British obstetrician and surgeon.

Furber was the son of Charles Furber. He was educated at Charterhouse School and trained as a doctor at St Bartholomew's Hospital in London. He became obstetric physician at Lady Howard de Walden’s Hospital for Officers’ Wives and during the First World War worked at the McCaul Military Hospital and Mackinnon Military Hospital, for which services he was appointed Commander of the Order of the British Empire (CBE) in January 1920. He later became honorary medical superintendent of St Luke's Hospital for Advanced Cases.

Furber married Olive Mann in 1890; they had one son and two daughters. His son, Stanhope, also became a surgeon. His brother was the cricketer Leonard Furber.

Footnotes

References
Biography, Who Was Who

1864 births
1940 deaths
People educated at Charterhouse School
Alumni of the Medical College of St Bartholomew's Hospital
Commanders of the Order of the British Empire
English obstetricians
English surgeons